Namilamadeta is an extinct genus of herbivorous marsupial from Australia that was around the size of a dog.

References 

Prehistoric mammals of Australia
Pleistocene marsupials
Prehistoric vombatiforms
Prehistoric marsupial genera